
Year 393 (CCCXCIII) was a common year starting on Saturday (link will display the full calendar) of the Julian calendar. At the time, it was known as the Year of the Consulship of Augustus and Augustus (or, less frequently, year 1146 Ab urbe condita). The denomination 393 for this year has been used since the early medieval period, when the Anno Domini calendar era became the prevalent method in Europe for naming years.

Events 
 By place 
 Roman Empire 
 January 23 – Emperor Theodosius I proclaims his son Honorius, age 8, co-ruler (Augustus) of the Western Roman Empire.
 Theodosius I demands the destruction of pagan temples, holy sites, and ancient objects throughout the Roman Empire.
 Theodosius I abolishes the Greek Olympic Games, ending a thousand years of festivals, as part of the general Christian policy to establish universal Christian worship in accordance with the doctrines set forth in the Nicene Creed (the next Olympic Games will not be held until 1896).

 China 
 Gao Zu succeeds Tai Zu as emperor of the Later Qin Empire.
 Chinese astronomers observe the guest star SN 393.
 By topic 
 Religion 
 Synod of Hippo: A council at Hippo Regius (Algeria) is hosted by the  Church. The bishops approve a canon of Sacred Scripture that correspond to the Roman Catholic Church.

Births 
 Sima Maoying, empress of the Liu Song Dynasty (d. 439)
 Theodoret of Cyrrhus, bishop and theologian (approximate date)

Deaths 
 Eunomius of Cyzicus, Arian bishop and theologian
 Zhai Zhao "Heavenly Prince" (Tian Wang), emperor of Wei

References